The Central Kimberley, an interim Australian bioregion, is located in the central Kimberley region of Western Australia, comprising an area of .

See also

Geography of Western Australia

References

Further reading
 Thackway, R and I D Cresswell (1995) An interim biogeographic regionalisation for Australia : a framework for setting priorities in the National Reserves System Cooperative Program Version 4.0 Canberra : Australian Nature Conservation Agency, Reserve Systems Unit, 1995. 

IBRA regions
Kimberley (Western Australia)
Kimberley tropical savanna